Aidan Ryan (born 30 January 1965) is an Irish retired hurler. His league and championship career with the Tipperary senior team spanned fifteen seasons from 1984 to 1999. 

Born in Borrisoleigh, County Tipperary, Ryan was raised in a strong hurling family. His father, Tim Ryan, and his uncles, Ned Ryan and Pat Stakelum, won All-Ireland medals with Tipperary between 1949 and 1951. 

Ryan enjoyed his first hurling successes with Templemore CBS while simultaneously appearing for the Borris–Ileigh club at juvenile and underage levels. He eventually joining the club's senior team. The highlight of his club career came in 1987 when he won an All-Ireland medal. Ryan also won one Munster medal and two county championship medals.

Ryan made his debut on the inter-county scene at the age of sixteen when he was selected for the Tipperary minor team. He enjoyed two championship seasons with the minor team, culminating with the winning of an All-Ireland medal in 1982. He subsequently joined the under-21 team, winning an All-Ireland medal in 1985. By this stage Ryan had also joined the Tipperary senior team, making his debut during the 1984-85 league. Over the course of the following fifteen seasons, he won All-Ireland medals in 1989 and 1991. Ryan also won five Munster medals and two National League medals. He was joined on the Tipperary team for much of his career by his brother Bobby. 

After being chosen on the Munster inter-provincial team for the first time in 1987, Ryan only made one further appearance with the team. During that time he won one Railway Cup medal.

Honours

Team

Borris–Ileigh
All-Ireland Senior Club Hurling Championship (1): 1987
Munster Senior Club Hurling Championship (1): 1986
Tipperary Senior Hurling Championship (2): 1983, 1986

Tipperary
All-Ireland Senior Hurling Championship (2): 1989, 1991
Munster Senior Hurling Championship (5): 1987, 1988, 1989, 1991, 1993
National Hurling League (2): 1987-88, 1993-94
All-Ireland Under-21 Hurling Championship (1): 1985
Munster Under-21 Hurling Championship (2): 1984, 1985
All-Ireland Minor Hurling Championship (1): 1982
Munster Minor Hurling Championship (2): 1982

Munster
Railway Cup (1): 1992

Individual

Awards
All Stars Awards (1): 1987

References

1965 births
Living people
Borrisoleigh hurlers
Tipperary inter-county hurlers
Munster inter-provincial hurlers
All-Ireland Senior Hurling Championship winners
People educated at Our Lady's Secondary School, Templemore